First Burial Ground is the place name of various places:

First Burial Ground, New London,  Connecticut
First Burial Ground (Woburn, Massachusetts)